The Chichester Tennis Tournament (Chichester, England) was a women's professional tennis tournament and part of the WTA Tour. The tournament was first held in 1970 and the final edition was held in 1980. It was held in the beginning of June and played on outdoor grass courts as a preparation to the Wimbledon Championships.

Evonne Goolagong Cawley won the tournament twice, in 1978 and 1979, and was the only multiple winner in the singles event.

Official names 
 1970–1971: Chichester International
 1972–1975: Rothmans Championships
 1976: Rose's Lime Juice International
 1977: Chichester International
 1978: Keith Prowse International
 1979–1980: Crossley Carpets Trophy

Finals

Singles

Doubles

References

External links 
 WTA website
 ITF 1978
 ITF 1979
 ITF 1980

Grass court tennis tournaments
Defunct tennis tournaments in the United Kingdom
Tennis tournaments in England
 
Sport in Chichester